Knowledge of Language: Its Nature, Origin, and Use is a book by American linguist Noam Chomsky, first published in 1986. In this book, Chomsky deals with topics in the philosophy of language and the philosophy of mind. He argues that the study of linguistic structures provides insight into the workings of human mind.

External links
 

Linguistics books
Books by Noam Chomsky
Philosophy of language literature
Philosophy of mind literature
1986 non-fiction books